Historiographic metafiction is a term coined by Canadian literary theorist Linda Hutcheon in the late 1980s. It incorporates three domains: fiction, history, and theory.

Concept 
The term is used for works of fiction which combine the literary devices of metafiction with historical fiction. Works regarded as historiographic metafiction are also distinguished by frequent allusions to other artistic, historical and literary texts (i.e. intertextuality) in order to show the extent to which works of both literature and historiography are dependent on the history of discourse.

Although Hutcheon said that historiographic metafiction is not another version of the historical novel, there are scholars (e.g. Monika Fludernik) who describe it as such, citing that it is simply an updated late-twentieth-century version of the genre for its embrace of the conceptualizations of the novel and of the historical in the twentieth century.

The term is closely associated with works of postmodern literature, usually novels. According to Hutcheon, in "A Poetics of Postmodernism", works of historiographic metafiction are "those well-known and popular novels which are both intensely self-reflexive and yet paradoxically also lay claim to historical events and personages". This is demonstrated in the genres that historiographic metafiction parodies, which it uses and abuses so that each parody constitutes a critique in the way it problematises them. This process is also identified as "subversion" for the purpose of exposing suppressed histories to allow the redefinition of reality and truth.

Examples 
Works often described as examples of historiographic metafiction include: The French Lieutenant's Woman by John Fowles (1969), Ragtime by E. L. Doctorow (1975), Legs by William Kennedy (1975), Kindred by Octavia E. Butler (1979), Midnight's Children by Salman Rushdie (1981), The Great Indian Novel by Shashi Tharoor  (1989), Possession by A. S. Byatt (1990), The English Patient by Michael Ondaatje (1992), The Master of Petersburg by J.M. Coetzee  (1994), and Mason & Dixon by Thomas Pynchon (1997). 

By seeking to represent both actual historical events from World War II while, at the same time, problematizing the very notion of doing exactly that, Kurt Vonnegut's Slaughterhouse-Five (1969) features a metafictional, "Janus-headed" perspective. Literary scholar Bran Nicol argues that Vonnegut's novel features "a more directly political edge to metafiction" compared to the writings of Robert Coover, John Barth, and Vladimir Nabokov.

References

Works cited
"Historiographic Metafiction: 'The Pastime of Past time'" from Fu Jen Catholic University
 Hutcheon, Linda: Historiographic Metafiction. Parody and the Intertextuality of History
Hutcheon, Linda. A Poetics of Postmodernism: History, Theory, Fiction. New York: 1988.
Kotte, Christina: Ethical Dimensions in British Historiographic Metafiction: Julian Barnes, Graham Swift, Penelope Lively. Trier: 2002, (Studies in English Literary and Cultural History, 2), .

Metafiction
Historiography
Literary criticism